Fabio Della Giovanna (born 21 March 1997) is an Italian professional footballer who plays as a centre-back for  club Pro Sesto.

Club career

Inter Milan 
On 15 May 2016, Della Giovanna made his senior debut against Sassuolo as a substitute for Rodrigo Palacio in the 81st minute of a 1–3 away defeat on the last day of the Serie A season.

Loan to Ternana 
On 19 August 2016, Della Giovanna and Raffaele Di Gennaro were signed by Ternana with a season-long loan deal with option to buy. On 25 October he made his debut for Ternana as a substitute replacing Giovanni Di Noia in the 81st minute of a 1–0 away defeat against Avellino. On 7 November Della Giovanna play his second match for Ternana, he was replaced by Luca Germoni in the 46th minute of a 1–0 home defeat against Benevento. Della Giovanna finish his loan to Ternana with only 2 appearances.

SPAL 
On 30 August 2017, Della Giovanna joined newly promoted Serie A team SPAL for an undisclosed fee.

Imolese 
On 17 July 2019, he joined Serie C club Imolese on a 2-year contract.

Pro Sesto
On 19 July 2021 he moved to Pro Sesto.

International career
With the Italy U-17 side he took part in the qualifiers of 2014 UEFA European Under-17 Championship, making three appearances, as Italy successfully went to the elite round. At the elite round, Della Giovanna made further two appearances as Italy finished in third positions, failing to qualify in the process.

Career statistics

Club

Honours

Club 
Inter Primavera

 Torneo di Viareggio: 2015
 Coppa Italia Primavera: 2015–16

References

External links
 

1997 births
Living people
People from Vizzolo Predabissi
Footballers from Lombardy
Italian footballers
Association football defenders
Serie A players
Serie B players
Serie C players
Inter Milan players
Ternana Calcio players
S.P.A.L. players
S.S. Arezzo players
F.C. Südtirol players
Imolese Calcio 1919 players
S.S.D. Pro Sesto players
Italy youth international footballers
Sportspeople from the Metropolitan City of Milan